Sugar mice are a traditional sugar candy popular in the United Kingdom, especially during the Christmas season. They traditionally consist of a boiled fondant formed from sugar and water. A modern non-cooked variation for children to make at home involves instead using icing sugar, egg whites and golden syrup. Various flavours and matching food dyes can be added (such as pink for strawberry or raspberry flavour, yellow or green for lemon, yellow or white for vanilla, orange for orange flavour, etc.). Small portions of the mass are formed into a mouse-like shape and decorated with a "tail" (traditionally cotton, although edible materials such as licorice may be used). The mice may be decorated (faces, messages) with additional fondant, icing sugar, chocolate, etc. Finally, they are left to dry for one or two days until they develop their typical, somewhat fudge-like dry and crumbly texture.

References

Confectionery